Ekaterina is a feminine given name.

Ekaterina may also refer to:
 Ekaterina (novel), 1993 novel by Donald Harington
 Ekaterina (TV series), a 2014 Russian historical television series
 6955 Ekaterina, a minor planet